Subasinghe is a Sri-Lankan name. It may refer to:

Dinesh Subasinghe (born 1979), Sri Lankan composer, violinist and music producer
Ramesh Subasinghe (born 1983), Sri Lankan cricketer
S. K. Subasinghe, Sri Lankan politician and member of the Parliament
Somalatha Subasinghe (1936–2015), Sri Lankan actress, playwright, theatre director and educator
Tikiri Banda Subasinghe (1913-1995), Sri Lankan statesman and Speaker of the Parliament of Sri Lanka

Sinhalese surnames